Pietrari is a commune in Dâmbovița County, Muntenia, Romania. It is composed of five villages: Aluniș, După Deal, Pietrari, Șipot and Valea. These were part of Bărbulețu Commune until 2004, when they were split off.

References

Communes in Dâmbovița County
Localities in Muntenia